Fried is a British sitcom that aired on BBC Three. The show stars Katy Wix, Mandeep Dhillon, Matthew Cottle, William Melling, Imran Yusuf and Lorna Gayle. It began airing on 25 August 2015 and ran for six episodes until 29 September 2015. A show pilot was aired on BBC iPlayer in 2014.

Synopsis
Fried is focused on staff who work at a chicken shop in Croydon, Seriously Fried Chicken. Mary Fawn (Katy Wix) is the manager much to the annoyance of her co-worker Derek Wom (Matthew Cottle) whose ambition of becoming a manager is thwarted by Mary's management. Other cast members include Amara (Mandeep Dhillon), who is only working there to earn money for her father; Joe (William Melling), who desperately wants the love of Amara; Ed (Imran Yusuf); and Shontal (Lorna Gayle).

Cast

 Katy Wix as Mary Fawn
 Mandeep Dhillon as Amara
 Matthew Cottle as Derek Wom
 William Melling as Joe
 Imran Yusuf as Ed
 Lorna Gayle as Shontal

Episodes

References

External links

2015 British television series debuts
2015 British television series endings
2010s British sitcoms
BBC television sitcoms
2010s British workplace comedy television series
English-language television shows
Television shows set in London
Television series set in restaurants
Television series by All3Media
Television series by Banijay